Saranga Disasekara (born 31 January 1983) is a Sri Lankan actor, singer, model and a host by profession. Saranga was awarded the most popular television actor in Sri Lanka award at Sumathi Awards, Raigam Tele'es and SLIM-Nielsen Peoples Awards several times. Currently, he is hosting Sri Lanka's most popular reality programme Hiru Star.

Personal life
Saranga Disasekara was born on 31 January 1983 in Kalubowila, Sri Lanka, to singer Narada Disasekara, and radio host and actress Tileka Ranasinghe. He completed school life at Thurstan College, Colombo and graduated from Northumbria University, Newcastle. Saranga's uncle Douglas Ranasinghe is also a popular artist in Sri Lanka.

After completing computer science for his higher studies, he entered commercials and minor cinema acting.

He was married to award-winning Sri Lankan actress Umali Thilakarathne but they got divorced.
On 28 August 2020 Saranga married Sri Lankan actress Dinakshie Priyasad and they welcomed their daughter Saranya Disasekara on 26 September 2021.

Career
At the age of 10, Saranga acted in the short film Marana Samapthiya. Then he was involved with many television commercials and radio castings.

His debut film in a major role was Nil Diya Yahana opposite Chathurika Peiris, which was directed by Dayaratne Ratagedara. However, his maiden cinema acting came through the 2003 film Irasma in a minor role.

He has acted in many popular teledramas in all genre from drama, tragedy, thriller and comedy. His most notable acting came through plays like Sulanga Matha Mohothak, Bonda Meedum, Kalu Kurulla, Wassane Premaya, Haara Kotiya, Kotipathiyo and Wes.

He has acted three stage dramas, Silgath Kokku, Mee Harak and Pirimiyekgen Paminillak.

Selected television serials
 Agni Piyapath as Manuranga / Anuradha
 Ahankara Nagare
 Akuru Maki Ne as Pawan 
 Alu Baduna as Wanamal
 Batahira Ahasa
 Binaramali
 Bonda Meedum as Dhanuka Rambukwella 
 Chanchala Rekha as Kapila / Megha
 Ganga Addara as Ranjit 
 Haara Kotiya as Lara Kumara
 Hansa Pihatu
 Heidi
 Hithuwakkari
 Kalu Kurulla as Sudu Appo
 Lansupathiniyo as Kehel Susa / Dhanushka
 Muthu Palasa
 Mini Gan Dela as Stephen
 Nirasha
 Paara Wasaa Aetha
 Paba
 Pabasara
 Pipi Piyum 
 Ran Samanalayo as Nilanga
 Renagala Walawwa 
 Sasara Bendi Bemi 
 Sandawatha Seya
 Smarana Samapthi
 Sooriya Kusuma
 Sulanga Matha Mohothak
 Wassane Premaya as Adithya Danthanarayana
 Wes as Devinda Disanayaka / Ryan De Silva

Filmography

Awards

References

External links
සාරංග ඩිනක්ෂි එක්ව පොලීසියට පැමිණිල්ලක්
සාරංගයි ඩිනක්ෂියි මොකක්ද මේ ආරවුල
ජෝති ප්‍රසංගයෙන් පස්සේ තාත්තා නාරද දිසාසේකර ගැන සාරංග හැමෝටම දැනෙන්න කියපු කතාව
විවාහය දෙදරා යන්නට හේතු වුණේ නොගැළපීම්-සාරංගගේ මව සියල්ල හෙළි කරයි

Living people
1983 births
Sri Lankan male television actors
Sri Lankan male film actors
Sinhalese male actors